George Bernard Erath (January 1, 1813 – May 13, 1891) served in both the Texas House of Representatives and Texas Senate.

Biography
Born in Vienna, Austria, he was a Texas pioneer and soldier who fought in the Texas Revolution, subsequently supporting the Republic's annexation to the United States.

As a surveyor, he drew up the original street grids for the Texas cities of Waco, Caldwell, and Stephenville. He was a charter member of historic Waco Masonic Lodge #92.

He married Lucinda Chalmers in December 1845, and they had five children.

He was elected to the Texas House of Representatives in 1844 and 1846, and to the Texas Senate in 1848, 1861, and 1873.

He died in Waco on May 13, 1891.

Erath County, Texas, is named for him.

References

1813 births
1891 deaths
Members of the Texas House of Representatives
Texas state senators
Austro-Hungarian emigrants to the United States
People of the Texas Revolution
American surveyors
Erath County, Texas
19th-century American politicians